Codex Pictures Limited was a British film production company. Codex Pictures was a private limited company founded in 2008 and dissolved in 2013.

Codex Pictures produced Ultramarines under licence from Games Workshop, working in association with Good Story Productions Ltd. and Montreal based POP6 Studios.

Productions

Production of Ultramarines was announced at the 2009 Games Day at the Birmingham NEC.

Ultramarines is a 70-minute sci-fi thriller  CGI movie set in Games Workshop's fictional Warhammer 40,000 universe and based around the Ultramarines Chapter of Space Marines. The screenplay was written by Black Library author Dan Abnett.

Notes

External links
 Official homepage
 Ultramarines movie official site

Film production companies of the United Kingdom